Miguel Anxo Fernández Lores (born 7 June 1954) is a Spanish medical doctor and since July 1999, the current Mayor of Pontevedra, representing Galician Nationalist Bloc (BNG)..

References

See also

External links 
Miguel Anxo Fernández Lores

1954 births
Living people
Politicians from Galicia (Spain)
Mayors of Pontevedra
People from Pontevedra
Spanish municipal councillors